Queen of the Mountains ( — Kurmanjan Datka) is a 2014 Kyrgyz epic drama film directed by Sadyk Sher-Niyaz. It was selected as the Kyrgyz entry for the Best Foreign Language Film at the 87th Academy Awards, but was not nominated.

Cast
 Elina Abai Kyzy as Kurmanjan Datka
 Nazira Mambetova as older Kurmanjan Datka
 Aziz Muradillayev as Alymbek Datka
 Adilet Usubaliyev as Kurmanjan Son Kamchybek
 Dildorbek Rahmonov as Uzbek old man

Plot
The film begins in 1816, when a young Kurmanjan Datka is brought to a fortune teller who foretells that she will one day be worth ten sons.

Critical reception
The film has received positive reviews, with the Montreal Gazette calling it "hauntingly poetic". Queen of the Mountains was named as one of the best of the Montreal World Film Festival by Cult Montreal and that it "should be nominated for an Oscar".

On 4 November 2014, a special screening of the film was hosted by Sharon Stone at the Egyptian Theater.

Awards
2014: Award for Best Feature Film at the 2014 Eurasian Film Festival

See also
 List of submissions to the 87th Academy Awards for Best Foreign Language Film
 List of Kyrgyz submissions for the Academy Award for Best Foreign Language Film

References

External links
 

2014 films
2014 drama films
2010s historical drama films
Kyrgyzstani drama films
Kyrgyz-language films
Films set in the 19th century